Josiomorphoides is a genus of moths in the subfamily Arctiinae. The genus was described by Hering in 1925.

Species
Josiomorphoides gigantea (Druce, 1897)
Josiomorphoides dognini Hering, 1925

References

External links

Arctiinae